The 1996 Auburn Tigers football team represented Auburn University in the 1996 NCAA Division I-A football season. 
Coached by Terry Bowden, they tallied an 8–4 record, played Army in the Independence Bowl, and finished the season ranked #22 in the AP Poll and #21 in the Coaches Poll.

Schedule

Roster

Season summary

Alabama

References

Auburn
Auburn Tigers football seasons
Independence Bowl champion seasons
Auburn Tigers football